Brian Thomas may refer to:

Brian Thomas (church artist) (1912–1989), British mural artist
Brian Thomas (politician) (born 1939), American politician in Washington state
Brian Thomas (rugby union) (1940–2012), Wales international rugby union player

See also
Bryan Thomas (disambiguation)